TF101 may refer to:

Toyota TF101, a Formula One car
Asus Eee Pad Transformer, an Android computer
TF-101B, a variant of the McDonnell F-101 Voodoo